The Saint John City Council or Saint John Common Council as distinguished by the city's own charter, is the city council for the city of Saint John, New Brunswick, Canada. The council consists of the mayor and ten councillors. In the 2007 Saint John, New Brunswick Ward Plebiscite, it was decided that as of the May 2008 quadrennial municipal elections, the city will be divided into four wards of approximately equal population, with two councillors to be elected by the voters in that ward, and two councillors to be elected at large. 

The Common Council consists of:
 The Mayor, who runs at-large, acts as chairman of the board.
 Two at-large Common Councillors.
 Two Common Councillors, from each of the city's four wards.
One is elected by the council to serve as Deputy Mayor.

As of 2021, the council's members are:
 Mayor: Donna Reardon
 Deputy Mayor: John MacKenzie (Ward 2)
 Councillors at Large: Gary Sullivan, Brent Harris
 Ward 1: Greg Norton, Joanna Killen
 Ward 2: Barry Ogden, John MacKenzie
 Ward 3: Gerry Lowe, David Hickey
 Ward 4: Greg Stewart, Paula Radwan

Responsibility 
Saint John is governed by a body of elected officials, referred to as "Common Council", whose responsibilities include:
 Setting the city operational budget
 Setting the City Water utility budget/ rates
 Enacting and amending by-laws
 Rezoning and land-use permissions of properties in Saint John.
 Setting the capital budget for the city
 Acting as the board of directors for the corporation "City of Saint John"
 Appointing persons to city staff and commissions
 Overseeing the operation of city commissions and departments

See also 
List of mayors of Saint John, New Brunswick

References

External links 
City of Saint John

Municipal councils in New Brunswick
Politics of Saint John, New Brunswick